Ricardo Acuña (born 13 January 1958) is a former tennis player from Chile, who won three doubles titles during his career. The right-hander reached his highest ATP singles ranking of World No. 47 in March 1986.

Since his retirement from competition, Acuña has served as both the assistant director and the Director of Tennis at the ATP Headquarters in Ponte Vedra Beach, Florida.  He currently serves on the USTA Player Development staff as a National Coach for Men's tennis.

Career finals

Singles (1 runner-up)

Doubles (3 titles, 2 runner-ups)

References

External links
 
 

1958 births
Living people
Chilean emigrants to the United States
Chilean male tennis players
Northwestern State University alumni
People from Jupiter, Florida
Tennis players from Santiago
Tennis people from Florida
Tennis players at the 1979 Pan American Games
Pan American Games medalists in tennis
Pan American Games silver medalists for Chile
Medalists at the 1979 Pan American Games
20th-century Chilean people